Ogata is a Japanese surname.

Ogata or Ōgata may also refer to:

Ogata, Ōita, a town in Ōita Prefecture, Japan
Ōgata, Akita, a village in Akita Prefecture, Japan
Ōgata, Kōchi, a former town in Kōchi Prefecture, Japan
Ōgata, Niigata, a former town in Niigata Prefecture, Japan